Eucithara ringens is a small sea snail, a marine gastropod mollusk in the family Mangeliidae.

Description
The length of the shell attains 6.2 mm, its diameter 2.6 mm.

This short shell with an conical shape has an acuminate apex. Its color is white. The shell contains 7 angular whorls. It is delicately sculptured with 8 longitudinally arcuate ribs (12 ribs on the penultimate whorl), latticed by fine,  revolving striae (about 23 on the penultimate whorl). The suture is deeply impressed. The aperture is narrow and oblong. The columella is slightly curved and contains a white callus. The thickened outer lip contains  8 denticles, the inner lip has 12 plicae.

Distribution
This marine species occurs off Hong Kong

References

External links
  Tucker, J.K. 2004 Catalog of recent and fossil turrids (Mollusca: Gastropoda). Zootaxa 682:1-1295
  Petit, R. E. (2009). George Brettingham Sowerby, I, II & III: their conchological publications and molluscan taxa. Zootaxa. 2189: 1–218
 Kilburn R.N. 1992. Turridae (Mollusca: Gastropoda) of southern Africa and Mozambique. Part 6. Subfamily Mangeliinae, section 1. Annals of the Natal Museum, 33: 461–575
 

ringens
Gastropods described in 1893